Venezia is the Italian name for the city of Venice.

Venezia may also refer to:

Places 
Piazza Venezia, a piazza in Rome, Italy
Palazzo Venezia, a palace in Rome, Italy
Porta Venezia, a district of Milan, Italy
Corso Venezia, a street in Milan, Italy
Porta Venezia (Milan Metro), a metro station in Milan
Venezia (Rome Metro), a planned metro station in Rome
Venezia, Arizona, a populated place in Yavapai County, Arizona

People
 Eugenio Da Venezia (1900–1992), Italian painter
 Mike Venezia (1945–1988), American jockey
 Morris Venezia (1921–2013), Jewish-Italian-Greek Holocaust survivor
 Shlomo Venezia (1923–2012), Greek-born Italian Jewish Holocaust survivor

Music
Venezia, song cycle in Italian by Reynaldo Hahn
Venezia, classical recital album by Max Emanuel Cencic
 "Venezia", a German poem set by Felix Draeseke
 "Venezia (song)", a 1983 single by Spanish group Hombres G
 "Venezia", a song from Athena (1954 film), a 1954 American musical
 "Venezia", a Japanese song by Ryuichi Sakamoto from the album Left Handed Dream

Other uses 
 Italian ironclad Venezia, a warship built in the 1860s
 Venezia F.C., an Italian football club
 Operation Venezia, a Second World War operation

See also 
 Hanjin Venezia, a container ship
 "Bella Venezia", an Italian fairy tale
 Venice (disambiguation)